Tukayevo (Tuqay) is a rural locality (a selo) and the administrative centre of Tukayevsky Selsoviet, Aurgazinsky District, Bashkortostan, Russia. The population was 547 as of 2010. There are 3  streets.

Geography 
Tukayevo is located 27 km north of Tolbazy (the district's administrative centre) by road. Akhmetovo is the nearest rural locality.

References 

Rural localities in Aurgazinsky District